Nikola Dragićević is a Serbian politician. He was elected to the National Assembly of Serbia in 2022 as a member of the far-right Serbian Party Oathkeepers (Srpska stranka Zavetnici, SSZ).

Private career
At the time of the 2022 Serbian parliamentary election, Dragićević was a graduate student in political science. He lives in the Belgrade municipality of Čukarica.

Politician
Dragićević was the president of the Oathkeepers executive board in 2017, when he took part in a party delegation to Moscow that signed a cooperation agreement with Vladimir Putin's United Russia party.

He appeared in the twelfth position on the SSZ's electoral list in the 2018 Belgrade city assembly election. The list did not cross the electoral threshold. He later appeared in the fourth position on the party's list in the 2020 parliamentary election and the fifteenth position (out of fifteen) on its list for the Čukarica municipal assembly in the concurrent 2020 Serbian local elections. The party fell below the threshold in both contests.

Dragićević again received the fourth position on the SSZ list in the 2022 parliamentary election and was this time elected when the list won ten seats. The Serbian Progressive Party (Srpska napredna stranka, SNS) and its allies won the election, and the SSZ serves in opposition. Dragićević is the deputy leader of his party's assembly group; he is also a member of the defence and internal affairs committee and the security services control committee, a deputy member of the committee on Kosovo and Metohija, and a member of Serbia's delegation to the Inter-Parliamentary Union assembly.

He was the SSZ's representative on the Belgrade city election commission for the 2022 city assembly election, which was held concurrently with the parliamentary vote. In the aftermath of the vote, he declined to support calls from the opposition United for the Victory of Serbia and We Must (Moramo) coalitions for repeat voting in certain areas. This led to charges that the SSZ was acting at the behest of the SNS, a charge that Dragićević denied. Dragićević himself appeared in the largely honorary 110th position (out of 110) on the SSZ's list for the Belgrade assembly; election from this position was a mathematical impossibility, and he was not elected when the list won four mandates.

References

1994 births
Living people
Politicians from Belgrade
Members of the National Assembly (Serbia)
Delegates to the Inter-Parliamentary Union Assembly
Serbian Party Oathkeepers politicians